Trzynasta w Samo Południe, is a Polish rock band formed in 2009.

In 2014 the band participated in the Polish version of the television show X Factor.

Discography
Studio albums

Music videos

References

Polish rock music groups
Musical groups established in 2009